The 2018 China Open was the fifth event of the 2018 ITTF World Tour. It was the third of six top-tier Platinum events on the tour, and took place from 31 May to 3 June in Shenzhen, China.

China's Ma Long became the most successful player in the event's history, winning his seventh China Open men's singles title.

Lin Gaoyuan and Chen Xingtong of China became the first ever winners of a mixed doubles tournament at an ITTF World Tour event, with the new category being included as part of the build-up to mixed doubles featuring on the table tennis programme at the 2020 Olympics.

Men's singles

Seeds

Draw

Top half

Bottom half

Finals

Women's singles

Seeds

Draw

Top half

Bottom half

Finals

Men's doubles

Seeds

Draw

Women's doubles

Seeds

Draw

Mixed doubles

Seeds

Draw

References

External links
 Tournament page on ITTF website

China Open
China Open
Sport in Shenzhen
Table tennis competitions in China
International sports competitions hosted by China
China Open
China Open
Sports competitions in Guangdong